Joseph Anton Friedrich Wilhelm Ihne (2 February 1821 – 21 March 1902) was a German historian who was a native of Fürth. He was the father of architect Ernst von Ihne (1848–1917).

Life
He studied philology at Bonn, obtaining his degree in 1843 with a thesis titled Quaestiones Terentianae. From 1847 to 1849 he was a teacher in Elberfeld, afterwards moving to England, where he taught school in Liverpool until 1863. He returned to Germany as a lecturer at the University of Heidelberg, where in 1873 he was appointed professor. He died in Heidelberg.

Works
Ihne is remembered for the classic Römische Geschichte (History of Rome), a work published in eight volumes from 1868 to 1890, and also translated into English. Other works on Roman history by Ihne include:
 Forschungen auf dem Gebiet der rom Verfassungsgeschichte, 1847; later published in English as: Researches into the History of the Roman Constitution, (1853).
 Early Rome : from the Foundation of the City to its Destruction by the Gauls (in English, 1875).
 Zur Ehrenrettung des Kaisers Tiberius ("A plea of the Emperor Tiberius"), 1892.

References

Bibliography
 translated Biography @ Meyers Konversations-Lexikon
 History of Rome (at Google Books)
 
 Researches into the History of the Roman Constitution in English translation and with an Appendix upon the Roman Knights (1853)
 History of Rome in English (at Internet Archive): five volumes from 1871 onwards: Volume 1 from Aeneas to the Conquest of  Italy; Volume 2 covering the Punic Wars; Volume 3 covering from 200 BC to 133 BC; Volume 4 covering Roman institutions and the Gracchi; Volume 5 from the Jugurthine War to Sulla.
 Römische Geschichte  in German (also at Internet Archive): remaining three volumes of Roman History covering roughly the period from Sulla's death to the dominance of Octavian / Augustus following the Battle of Actium in 31 BC: Volume 6 and Volumes 7 and 8 combined
 Early Rome : from the Foundation of the City to its Destruction by the Gauls in English translation (1898)

External links
 
 

19th-century German historians
1821 births
1902 deaths
Academic staff of Heidelberg University
German male non-fiction writers